Pain Vand (also Romanized as Pā’īn Vand) is a village in Salehan Rural District, in the Central District of Khomeyn County, Markazi Province, Iran. At the 2006 census, its population was 748, in 197 families.

References 

Populated places in Khomeyn County